Daniel Harris ( – 13 June 1840) was an English builder, prison governor, civil engineer, and architect prominent in Oxford.

Family
Harris's birthplace is obscure but he was born about 1761, as the entry in St-Peter-le-Bailey's register for his death in 1840 records his age as 79. He married Elizabeth Tomkins of Oxford in 1789, and they had four daughters between 1791 and 1801. Harris died at his home in New Road, Oxford in June 1840.

Career
Harris came to Oxford as a journeyman carpenter and rose to become Governor of Oxford Castle and Prison from 1786 until 1809. He developed a contracting business with convict labour, supplemented by hiring wage-earning tradesmen.

Harris became involved in waterway engineering, starting by being the contractor to extend the Oxford Canal in Oxford from Hayfield Road to Worcester Street and build the Worcester Street wharves 1788–89. He built four pound locks to replace flash locks, the first being Osney Lock for the Thames Navigation Commission in 1790. In central Oxford the Oxford Canal and the River Thames were originally linked by a flash lock at Hythe Bridge. In 1795–97, Harris replaced it with Isis Lock, a broad lock to allow Thames barges in and out of the Oxford Canal Company's Worcester Street wharves. None of Harris's pound locks survives in the form in which he built them. The Oxford Canal rebuilt Isis Lock as a narrow lock in 1844, and all of his Thames locks have been either rebuilt or replaced.

From 1812 until 1837, Harris worked in partnership with the architect John Plowman.

Work

Oxford Prison, Oxford: enlargement, 1785–1805 (to designs by William Blackburn)
Oxford Canal, Oxford: Worcester Street Wharf, 1788–89
River Thames, Oxfordshire: Osney Lock, Oxford, 1790
River Thames, Oxfordshire: Godstow Lock, Godstow, 1790
River Thames, Oxfordshire: Pinkhill Lock, Farmoor, 1791
Oxford Canal, Oxford: New Road Wharf, Oxford, 1793 and 1801
River Thames, Oxfordshire: Sandford Lock, Sandford-on-Thames, 1795
Oxford Canal, Oxford: Isis Lock 1795–97 (rebuilt 1844)
Wyaston House, New Inn Hall Street, Oxford 1795–97 (for the Oxford Canal Navigation Company) (now Linton House, part of St Peter's College, Oxford)
Braziers Park House, Ipsden, Oxfordshire: re-fronting, 1799
Saint Mary's parish, Bampton, Oxfordshire: alterations to rectory, 1799
Saint Botolph's parish, Swyncombe, Oxfordshire: rectory, 1803
Abingdon Prison, Abingdon, Oxfordshire, 1805–11 (to designs by Jeffry Wyattville)
Saint Mary Magdalene parish, Stoke Talmage, Oxfordshire: extension to rectory, 1820

References

Sources

1761 births
Year of birth uncertain
1840 deaths
English civil engineers